Samuel Crothers (October 22, 1783 – July 20, 1855) was a Presbyterian minister, writer, and outspoken antislavery advocate.

Biography 
Born in Franklin County, Pennsylvania, Samuel Crothers was raised in Kentucky from 1787 until 1804. In 1804 he moved to New York to attend the Presbyterian theological seminary under the charge of Dr. John M. Mason. In 1809, following his seminary training, Crothers was licensed to preach. He soon accepted a call to serve as pastor of both the Associate Reformed Church of Chillicothe, Ohio, and the Hop Run Church just southeast of Greenfield. This post lasted until 1813, when he devoted his time fully to the Hop Run Church. In 1818, Crothers joined the Presbyterian Church, returning to Greenfield 1820 to organize the Greenfield Presbyterian Church.

Crothers is notable for having spent much of his lifetime writing and speaking against those who had made a biblical case for slavery, especially in his articles published in the Quarterly Anti-slavery Magazine. Crothers, a well-respected theologian and debater, debated the issue with theological giants of the era including Charles Hodge. Noteworthy among Crothers' work are fifteen letters published in the Cincinnati Journal, an "Appeal to Patriots and Christians, in Behalf of Enslaved Africans." In addition, Crothers published several books, including The Gospel of the Jubilee and The Life of Abraham.

Publications 

Samuel Crothers. "Slavery and the Biblical Repertory" in The Quarterly Anti-slavery Magazine. Vol II, April, 1837, No.3.
Samuel Crothers. The Gospel of the Jubilee. IM Waters, 1837

Bibliography 
Greenfield Ohio Historical Society. "Greenfield's Stand Against Slavery." Greenfield: Turner Publishing, 2000.
Robert Christy Galbraith. The History of the Chillicothe Presbytery: From its Organization in 1799 to 1889. Harvard: H.W. Guthrie, Hugh Bell and Peter Platter,Committee on Publication, 1889
J. W. Klise, A. E. Hough. The County of Highland: a History of Highland County, Ohio. New York: Northwestern Historical Association, 1902.

James Grant Wilson, John Fiske. Appleton's Cyclopædia of American Biography, Volume 2. Princeton: D. Appleton and company,1887.

People from Franklin County, Pennsylvania
1783 births
1855 deaths
American Presbyterian ministers
American abolitionists
Associate Reformed Presbyterian Church
People from Greenfield, Ohio
Presbyterian abolitionists